Ben Thompson is an American business, technology, and media analyst, who is based in Taiwan. He is the author of Stratechery, a subscription-based newsletter/podcast featuring commentary on tech and media news. He is also the co-host of Exponent with James Allworth and Dithering with John Gruber, all podcasts focused on the same themes.

Thompson's career includes stints at Apple, where he interned at Apple University; Microsoft, where he worked on its Windows Apps team; and at WordPress developer Automattic as a growth engineer. 

Thompson launched Stratechery as a blog while still a Microsoft employee, and in April 2014 devoted himself to the site full-time, operating on a "freemium" subscription model. He has stated his primary inspiration was John Gruber, author of the site Daring Fireball.

As of April 2015, Thompson had more than 2,000 paying subscribers. By 2017, Recode described Stratechery as having pioneered the paid newsletter business model. The founders of Substack, a newsletter platform launched in 2018, called Thompson a major inspiration for their project.

Thompson's undergraduate education was at the University of Wisconsin-Madison, and his graduate education at Northwestern University, where he received an MBA from the Kellogg School as well as an MEM from the McCormick School of Engineering.

Aggregation Theory
Thompson is a proponent of 'aggregation theory', which describes how platforms (i.e. aggregators such as Google and Facebook) come to dominate the industries in which they compete in a systematic and predictable way. Aggregators have all three of the following characteristics: 1. direct relationship with users; 2. zero marginal costs for serving users; 3. and demand-driven multi-sided networks with decreasing acquisition costs.

References

External links
 
 

American business writers
American podcasters
Kellogg School of Management alumni
Northwestern University alumni
University of Wisconsin–Madison alumni
Place of birth missing (living people)
Year of birth missing (living people)
Living people
American technology writers
Technology commentators
WordPress